Arthur Clements (22 January 1921 – 12 November 1993) was an Australian rules footballer who played for the Hawthorn Football Club in the Victorian Football League (VFL).

Notes

External links 

1921 births
1993 deaths
Australian rules footballers from Victoria (Australia)
Hawthorn Football Club players